This is a list of notable hardcore punk bands from Chicago, Illinois and its surrounding areas.

88 Fingers Louie
Arma Angelus
Articles of Faith
Bhopal Stiffs
The Bollweevils
Charles Bronson
The Fighters
Harm's Way
Hewhocorrupts
The Killing Tree
Los Crudos
Masters of the Obvious
Pegboy
Racetraitor
Rise Against
Screeching Weasel (early)
Weekend Nachos

References

Hardcore punk bands
Lists of bands